The Mandelia Faunal Reserve in Chad was declared a reserve in 1969 covering an area of 1380 km2

Geography
The reserve gets flooded when the rivers Chari and Logone overflow during the rainy season.

Wildlife
The reserve has a good amount of dense savanna woodland vegetation.

The fauna consists of mammals including elephant (there were 660 initially when the reserve came to be gazetted Many  
ungulate species and birds are also reported. Larger mammals species such as elephant and kob which had migrated to Cameroon are reported  to be coming back to Chad due to hunting pressure in that country.

Conservation
There are apart from poaching pressure, illegal grazing and cultivation which are issues created by the local people inhabiting in many villages within the reserve and also poachers and from Cameroon. There are indications that the reserve may be de-gazetted.

References

Faunal reserves
Protected areas of Chad